Nedre Romerike District Court is a district court located in Lillestrøm, Norway. It covers the municipalities of Lørenskog, Skedsmo, Rælingen, Fet, Aurskog-Høland, Sørum, Gjerdrum and Nittedal and is subordinate Eidsivating Court of Appeal.

References

External links 
Official site 

Defunct district courts of Norway
Organisations based in Lillestrøm